Carlos Andre Carson (born December 28, 1958) is a former professional American football player drafted by the Kansas City Chiefs in the fifth round of the 1980 NFL Draft.  A , 184 lb wide receiver from Louisiana State University, Carson played in 10 NFL seasons from 1980 to 1989.  His best year came during the 1983 season when he caught 80 receptions for 1,351 yards and seven touchdowns.  During that same season, Carson had the second most receiving yards in the NFL, only behind Philadelphia Eagles receiver Mike Quick with 1,409 yards.

As a high school senior, Carson was not heavily recruited. LSU coaches were reviewing film of another player on Carson's team but kept noticing this wide receiver making plays. When they contacted Carlos to ask him to visit LSU, he asked if they were offering him scholarship. The coach said yes and Carson accepted right then. In his first game as a starter at LSU he caught five touchdown passes against Rice University.

On February 26, 2017, Carson was announced as the 2017 inductee into the Chiefs Hall of Fame. He was officially inducted on October 30, 2017.

References

1958 births
Living people
Sportspeople from Palm Beach, Florida
American football wide receivers
LSU Tigers football players
Kansas City Chiefs players
Philadelphia Eagles players
American Conference Pro Bowl players